Elliptera omissa is a species of limoniid crane fly in the family Limoniidae.

References

Limoniidae
Insects described in 1863